Joseph or Joe Miller may refer to:

Politicians
Joseph Miller (Ohio politician) (1819–1862), U.S. Representative from Ohio
Joseph Miller (Wisconsin politician) (1847–?), Wisconsin State Assemblyman
Joseph Miller (Michigan politician) (fl. 1820s), member of the Michigan Territorial Council 
Joe Miller (Alaska politician) (born 1967), 2010 Republican and 2016 Libertarian nominee for U.S. Senate in Alaska
Joe Miller (North Dakota politician) (fl. 2000s–2010s), American politician in the North Dakota Senate
Joe Miller (Ohio politician) (born 1969), American politician elected to Ohio House of Representatives in 2018

Sportspeople

Baseball
Joe Miller (second baseman) (1850–1891), Major League Baseball player
Joe Miller (shortstop) (1861–1928), Major League Baseball player
Cannon Ball Miller (Joseph Miller, fl. 1900–1906), baseball pitcher in the pre-Negro leagues
Cyclone Miller (Joseph H. Miller, 1859–1916), Major League pitcher

Football
Joe Miller (footballer, born 1967), Scottish footballer
Joe Miller (footballer, born 1899), Irish footballer
Joe Wang Miller (born 1989), association footballer

Other sports
Joseph Miller (cricketer) (died 1784), English cricketer
Joe Miller (ice hockey) (1898–1963), Canadian ice hockey player
Joe Miller (commentator) (born 1987), electronic sports commentator
Joe Miller (rugby league) (fl. 1900s–1910s), rugby league footballer for Great Britain, England, and Wigan
Joe Miller (golfer) (born 1984), British long drive golfer
Joey Miller (born 1985), NASCAR driver

Other people
Joseph Miller (priest) (1874–?), English nonconformist minister, then Anglican priest
Joe Miller (actor) (1684–1738), English actor, the namesake of the 18th-century jokebook Joe Miller's Jests
Sir Joseph Holmes Miller (1919–1986), New Zealand surveyor, Antarctic explorer and conservationist
Joseph C. Miller (born 1940), American historian
Joseph S. Miller (1848–1921), Internal Revenue Service commissioner
Joseph Wayne Miller (?–2018), American actor
J. Hillis Miller (born 1928), American literary critic
J. Hillis Miller Sr. (1899–1953), American university professor, administrator, and psychologist
J. Irwin Miller (1909–2004), American industrialist and patron of modern architecture

In fiction
A character in the 1993 film Philadelphia

See also
Josef Miller (1890–1985), German Jesuit theologian and superior
Joseph Millar (fl. 1960s–2010s), American poet
Joseph Millar (sprinter) (born 1992), New Zealand sprinter